Campiglossa subochracea is a species of fruit fly in the family Tephritidae.

Distribution
The species is found in France.

References

Tephritinae
Insects described in 1934
Diptera of Europe